Bruno França Fogaça (born 11 November 1981) is a Brazilian footballer who plays for Guarani (MG).

Biography
The forward had played for IF Elfsborg, Skoda Xanthi and Naval 1º de Maio. He signed for Marítimo in 2007 on a free transfer. in January 2009 he left the club and joined United Arab Emirates side Al-Shaab. In 2009–10 season returned to Portugal for Rio Ave. In September 2010 he returned to Brazil, but Bragantino did not formally register him as a player. in January 2011 he left for Guarani of Minas Gerais state.

References

External links
 Official Site 
 

Brazilian footballers
Allsvenskan players
Primeira Liga players
Super League Greece players
IF Elfsborg players
Avaí FC players
Associação Naval 1º de Maio players
Xanthi F.C. players
C.S. Marítimo players
Rio Ave F.C. players
G.D. Estoril Praia players
Brazilian expatriate footballers
Expatriate footballers in Sweden
Expatriate footballers in Portugal
Expatriate footballers in Greece
Expatriate footballers in the United Arab Emirates
Brazilian expatriate sportspeople in Sweden
Brazilian expatriate sportspeople in Portugal
Brazilian expatriate sportspeople in Greece
Brazilian expatriate sportspeople in the United Arab Emirates
Association football forwards
Footballers from São Paulo (state)
Living people
1981 births